Mozart is a crater on Mercury, named by the IAU in 1976 after Austrian composer Wolfgang Amadeus Mozart.

The arc of dark hills visible on the crater's floor represents remnants of a central peak ring. Mozart is one of 110 peak ring basins on Mercury.  A close inspection of the area around Mozart crater shows many long chains of secondary craters, formed by impact of material thrown out during the formation of the main crater. 

Mozart crater is located just south of the Caloris basin.  To the southeast is Tir Planitia.

Views

References

Impact craters on Mercury
Cultural depictions of Wolfgang Amadeus Mozart